Carolina Omaña (born 1967) is a Venezuelan actress and beauty pageant titleholder who won Miss Venezuela International at 1989 and was the official representative of Venezuela to the Miss International 1989 pageant held in Kanazawa, Japan, on September 17, 1989, when she won the title of 2nd runner up.

Omaña competed in the national beauty pageant Miss Venezuela 1989 and obtained the title of Miss Venezuela International. She represented Nueva Esparta state.

References

External links
Miss Venezuela Official Website
Miss International Official Website

1967 births
Living people
People from Caracas
Miss Venezuela International winners
Miss International 1989 delegates